Mieko Mori (born 13 April 1966) is a Japanese gymnast. She competed in six events at the 1988 Summer Olympics. Her achievement ranking is 3,715.

References

1966 births
Living people
Japanese female artistic gymnasts
Olympic gymnasts of Japan
Gymnasts at the 1988 Summer Olympics
Place of birth missing (living people)
20th-century Japanese women